Ruy Valentim Lourenco (March 25, 1928 – August 15, 2021) was an American physician, academic administrator, researcher and professor who was Dean of the New Jersey Medical School from 1989 to 1999. He led medicine at the University of Illinois College of Medicine from 1983 to 1989. The Ruy V. Lourenco Center for the Study of Emerging and Re-emerging Pathogens is named in his honor.

Bibliography
 

1928 births
2021 deaths
People from Lisbon
Portuguese emigrants to the United States
University of Medicine and Dentistry of New Jersey faculty